The 2016 Accra floods were heavy rainfalls in Accra, the capital of Ghana in June 2016. The flood began on June 9, 2016. As of June 15, 2016, at least 10 people have been killed.

See also
2015 Accra floods

References

Accra floods
2016 in Ghana
2016 disasters in Ghana
21st century in Accra
Floods in Ghana
History of Accra